Ayşe Cora (born 3 March 1993) is a Turkish professional basketball player for Botaş SK.

Honors

National
2012 FIBA Europe Under-20 Championship for Women – 
2013 FIBA Europe Under-20 Championship for Women –

Club
 2x Turkish Women's Basketball League champion (2018, 2019)
 2x Turkish Women's Basketball Cup champion (2019, 2020)
 Turkish Women's Basketball Presidential Cup champion (2019)

See also
Turkish women in sports

References

External links

1993 births
Living people
Galatasaray S.K. (women's basketball) players
Shooting guards
Basketball players from Istanbul
Turkish women's basketball players
Basketball players at the 2016 Summer Olympics
Olympic basketball players of Turkey
Beşiktaş women's basketball players
Migrosspor basketball players
Fenerbahçe women's basketball players